Alexander James Cropley (born 16 January 1951) is a retired footballer who played as a midfielder for Hibernian, Aston Villa, Arsenal, Newcastle United and Portsmouth. Born in England, he was capped for the Scotland national team.

Career
Cropley was born in Aldershot, Hampshire. His father is Jack Cropley, who was playing for Aldershot at the time. Cropley junior, who grew up in Edinburgh, began his career with Hibernian, where he featured in the famed team of the early 1970s known as "Turnbull's Tornadoes". While with Hibs he won the Scottish League Cup of 1972, in a 2–1 victory in the final, against Celtic. Despite being born in the south of England, Cropley was eligible for Scotland and he was selected for matches played against Belgium and Portugal in 1971.

Late in 1974, Cropley moved to London where he turned down an offer from Chelsea to play for Arsenal, whom he signed for in a deal worth £150,000. He made his debut for the Gunners against Carlisle United on 7 December 1974. Cropley then broke his leg in a match away to Middlesbrough in January 1975 and broke it again soon after his comeback. He returned to make 22 appearances in the 1975–76 season, but could not secure a regular place in Arsenal's first team. He then linked up with Aston Villa in September 1976, having played 30 league games with five goals scored altogether for Arsenal.

At Villa, he featured in a memorable win against the great Liverpool side of the period. Cropley also appeared in the League Cup Final of 1977 against Everton. The final needed to be replayed after the game ended in a draw. The second final saw the two teams once again finish the game tied altogether.  In the eventual third final, with the game going to extra time, Villa won by a 3–2 margin over the Toffees and in so doing Cropley victoriously lifted the Cup. He thereafter yet again suffered another a broken leg, in a game versus local rivals West Bromwich Albion on 10 December 1977. Cropley then had a spell on loan at Newcastle United from January to June 1980, returning to Villa in July of that year. Cropley left Villa Park in March 1981 to feature a month later for club Toronto Blizzard in the North American Soccer League. He then left Blizzard in October 1981 and to link up in the following month for Portsmouth. He then ended his days as a professional footballer in 1982 due to persistent and serious injuries at the relatively young age of 31.

Personal life
After his playing days came to an end, Cropley became a taxi driver within his hometown of Edinburgh. His son Jordan is also a footballer, who played for Hibernian's academy. Jordan went on to feature for Scottish clubs Berwick Rangers, Arniston Rangers and Haddington Athletic.

An autobiography entitled Crops: The Alex Cropley Story was released in 2013.

Cropley was diagnosed as suffering from dementia in December 2020.

Honours
Hibernian
Scottish League Cup: 1972

Aston Villa
Football League Cup: 1977

Individual
Hibernian F.C. Hall of Fame: 2017

See also
 List of Scotland international footballers born outside Scotland

References

External links
 
 
 Gunner Mania player biography
 

1951 births
Arsenal F.C. players
Aston Villa F.C. players
Expatriate soccer players in Canada
Association football midfielders
Hibernian F.C. players
Living people
Newcastle United F.C. players
North American Soccer League (1968–1984) players
Portsmouth F.C. players
Scotland international footballers
Scottish expatriate footballers
Scottish expatriate sportspeople in Canada
Scottish Football League players
Scottish footballers
English Football League players
Toronto Blizzard (1971–1984) players
Sportspeople from Aldershot
Scotland under-23 international footballers
Anglo-Scots
Footballers from Hampshire